The Egyptian Organization for Human Rights (EOHR), founded in April 1985 and with its headquarters in Cairo, Egypt, is a non-profit NGO and one of the longest-standing bodies for the defense of human rights in Egypt.  It investigates, monitors, and reports on human rights violations and defends people's rights regardless of the identity, gender or color of the victim. EOHR faces any human rights violations made either by governmental or non-governmental parties. It is registered with the United Nations and works with other human rights groups.

Overview
The Egyptian Organization for Human Rights (EOHR) was founded in 1985 by Saad Eddin Ibrahim and Hani Shukrallah. It was the first human rights organization in the country and remains one of the most professional non-governmental organizations (NGOs) in Egypt. Its headquarters is in Cairo, and has regional branches with a national membership of approximately 2,300 active volunteers in 17 provincial branches located across the country. EOHR is a non-profit NGO working within the framework of the principles established in the Universal Declaration of Human Rights and other international human rights instruments regardless of the identity or affiliation of the victim or violator .

EOHR acts and reports on both governmental and non-governmental human rights violations. According to its reports issues annually the decade of the late 1980s through to the late 1990s was marked by an increase in torture in Egypt. During this period the organization's activists were regularly harassed and arrested making their work increasingly difficult. Despite these challenges the organization maintained a steady accounting of state and non-state violations of human rights and started a series of publications of human rights books to raise awareness of human rights issues in the country. An attempt to start a theater company to tour villages with plays improvised on human rights topics was scrapped after the organizer was arrested by state security forces. During the last decade of the Mubarak dictatorship the EOHR was represented, while maintaining its independence, on the state sponsored Supreme Council of Human Rights.

EOHR's international status
EOHR is part of the wider international and Arab human rights movement. It cooperates with the United Nations human rights bodies, as well as with other international and regional human rights organizations. EOHR was registered at the Ministry of Social Affairs in 2003 under registration No. 5220/2003.

EOHR was granted special consultative status with the United Nations Economic and Social Council in 2006. This consultative status enables EOHR to enjoy closer interaction with the United Nations by participating in the activities of the International Council for Human Rights, according to ECOSOC decision 31/1996. This decision aimed to reinforce the principles of the human rights stipulated in the Universal Declaration of Human Rights, the Vienna Declaration and all other international human rights documents. EOHR is also a member of five international organizations: the Arab Organization for Human Rights (AOHR), the World Organisation Against Torture (OMCT), International Federation for Human Rights (IFHR), the International Commission of Jurists (ICJ), and the International Freedom of Expression Exchange (IFEX).

Goals
 To provide full respect for human rights and the basic freedoms of all Egyptians and non-Egyptians who are in Egypt, according to the Universal Declaration of Human Rights and other international human rights instruments. These include, in particular, the International Covenant on Civil and Political Rights (ICCPR), the International Covenant on Economic, Social and Cultural Rights (ICESCR) and the United Nations Declaration on the Elimination of All Forms of Racial Discrimination. EOHR defends the human rights of all individuals and groups against all forms of violation.
 To reform the Egyptian constitution and legislation to bring them into accordance with international human rights covenants and conventions.
 To promote the rule of law and full respect for an independent judiciary.
 To guarantee the right to participation in public affairs without discrimination due to opinion, religion, gender, race or color.
 To guarantee freedom of opinion and expression, in addition to artistic and literary invention.
 To guarantee freedom of belief, thought and religion.
 To ensure a fair trial for all defendants before a competent judge regardless of the kind of charge. To grant legal aid to those defendants if possible and necessary.
 To call for the release of those who are detained, or whose freedoms are restricted, due to the peaceful expression of their opinions or because of their beliefs, religion, race, gender or color.
 To provide legal aid to the victims of violations against the freedom of opinion and expression. In addition, to assist prisoners and detainees who are subject to torture or other cruel, inhuman and degrading treatment.
 To ensure that prison regulations and the treatment of prisoners are in conformity with the international Standard Minimum Rules for the Treatment of Prisoners.

Working methods
EOHR adopts peaceful methods to promote and defend human rights. It believes that the promotion of human rights is a common goal for the entire world community and it is determined to spare no peaceful effort in its struggle against human rights violations. His main actions are:

 Monitoring, observing and documenting the human rights violation and informing the official bodies about the violation incidents.
 Issuing press releases on the human rights violations.
 Providing legal support for the human rights'  violation victims.
 Holding open discussions on the Egyptian laws in order to comply with the international covenants of human rights. 
 Launching specific and specialized campaigns for raising awareness of the human rights issues. 
 Providing training for media and legal specialists on the human rights principles.
 Holding training workshops for EOHR members and others for raising awareness of human rights.
 Preparing researches on the human rights issues.
 Holding an annual meeting for discussing human rights' issues.
The EOHR accomplishes this by fact-finding missions. These include visits to prisons in order to collect testimonies, and to obtain document information about human rights violations. It also Issues urgent appeals, press releases, reports and publications on human rights violations. Furthermore, the EOHR tries to raise awareness on human rights issues among individuals and groups through publications, conferences, seminars and studies. In addition, this organization contacts Egyptian governmental and non-governmental bodies as well as international, regional and national organizations to seek co-operation, obtain information and take action to increase respect for human rights. Through the use of these methods the EOHR has adopted a peaceful method to promote and defend human rights in Egypt.

Organizational structure
The General Assembly of fee-paying members holds supreme authority in EOHR. A General Assembly meeting is convened once every other year to review and evaluate the organization's progress and to elect the board of trustees. The board of trustees is the policy-making body within the EOHR and is led by the chairman. It is made up of fifteen elected members, and up to four other prominent figures in the field of human rights can be invited by the board of trustees to join.

The executive board is elected by the board of trustees and consists of the Secretary-General, the Treasurer and representatives of the main committees of the organization. The executive board, led by the Secretary-General, is responsible for the day-to-day activities of the EOHR and for any decisions made in the interim period between meetings of the board of trustees.

EOHR has five substantive and inter-linked units, two projects and three auxiliary units:

The Field Work Unit
The unit includes a number of lawyers who receive complaints on the human rights violations and do the required investigations in order to make sure that the complaint is serious. They receive individual allegations of human rights violations and investigate each case's merits. Much of their work takes place in the field, on the ground, in prisons, in court, in detention centers, in homes, anywhere information can be found. The investigating lawyer writes an official report on each case. Then, depending on the nature and the merits of the case, the case may be removed from consideration or investigated further. Appeals and requests for information may be made to competent authorities and complainants may receive free legal counsel so that they can pursue a formal suit. All services made available to victims of human rights violations are absolutely free of charge. The unit does also the following:
 Conducting fact finding committees for capturing information and documentation of human rights'  violations.
 Addressing the concerned official bodies and submitting complaints to the Prosecutor General, the Minister of Interior, the Manager of the Prisons'  Authority, the Security Directorates' managers, Governors, ministries and embassies. 
The Legal Support Unit
The unit includes a number of lawyers located at the headquarters of EOHR and others in the governorates to do the following: 
 Attending investigations before the prosecutor general concerning the human rights' violation issues.
 Representing the human rights'  violation victims in court.
 Filing lawsuits before the State Council to cancel the decisions that do not comply with the international covenants.

The Research and Publishing Unit
This unit conducts academic research on human rights issues, analyzes the raw material of human rights abuses supplied by the Field Work Unit and the WLAP. This desk is responsible for producing EOHR's reports and is our routine link to the Arab media. The unit handles the following:
 Placing programs, projects and future activities of EOHR. 
 Drafting and editing the annual report of the human rights'  situation in Egypt.
 Drafting press releases on the human rights'  situation in Egypt. 
 Preparation of researches on different aspects of the human rights in Egypt.
 Organizing seminars, open discussion workshops, conferences, training workshops and the annual intellectual forum.
 Preparation of researches for representing EOHR in local and international events. 
 Coordination and cooperation with the local and international human rights'  NGOs and journalists, who cover the news of EOHR. 
The Foreign Relation and Translation Unit
This unit coordinates EOHR's partnerships with other human rights organizations throughout the non-Arab world. This desk also coordinates our endless battle to equip us with the financial resources necessary to meet our objectives.
Moreover, it is responsible for translating all EOHR's literature into English so that it can be shared with the English-speaking world. Thus, the unit includes a number of translators work on the following:
 Opening communication channels with the UN's arms, especially the National Council for Human Rights.
 Coordination between EOHR and the regional and foreign human rights' organizations.
 Translation of EOHR reports and press releases. 
 Preparation of researches on the international human rights issues.
 Participation in the international activities supporting the human rights'  issues. 
 Participation in preparation of programs and projects that match EOHR targets. 
 Following up EOHR consultancy file.

The Training Unit

The unit includes a number of certified specialized trainers doing the following:
 Preparation of training materials on the human rights'  issues. 
 Providing training services for EOHR members in order to spread the human rights'  culture.

The Women's Legal Aid Project (WLAP)

This project manages human rights problems dealing with women's issues. Such problems include marital and family issues and sexual discrimination. WLAP undertakes most of the work supporting campaigns that focus on women's issues and coordinates an educational and training program aimed at increasing women's legal literacy in Egypt's poorer areas.

Refuge Legal Aid Project
This project was established in 2001 as a joint project between EOHR and the American University in Cairo. This unit provides legal aid to those who seek refugee status in Egypt and it works within the framework of the United Nations High Commissioner for Refugees (UNHCR).

Accounting and Financial Unit

The Unit handles the accounting works and prepares the annual financial report of EOHR.

Administrative and Secretarial Unit

The unit handles all the administrative and secretarial works, organizes meetings'  appointments of the secretary general, prepares the published materials to be sent to those who are interested in the human rights'  issues, via E-mail or fax.

Archiving Unit

The unit handles paper and electronic archiving of the published materials of EOHR.

Campaigns
 Campaign Against Torture 
 Campaign Against Inhumane Prison Conditions. 
 Campaign for the Defense of Freedom of Thought and Belief 
 Campaign to Restore the Rights of Egyptian Prisoners of War 
 Campaign to Cancel the State of Emergency in Egypt

Achievements
 EOHR conducted a campaign to cancel Flogging in prisons in 1990 and the Egyptian government responded by submitting a draft law to cancel flogging in the year 2000. 
 Since EOHR was established in 1985, it has been working on facing torturing prisoners and arrested people in the police stations and detention centers; so it always issues reports on the tortured cases. It has submitted three reports on torture to the UN's World Organization against Torture. The last report was submitted in 2002. 
 EOHR conducted a campaign to confront torture in Egypt in 2003. The report indicated that torture in Egypt is based on specific studied methodology. So EOHR held a number of discussion workshops and prepared a draft law amending some articles in the criminal law, related to torture.
 EOHR, in cooperation with The International Federation for Human Rights (FIDH), has launched a campaign for cancelling Death Penalty. 
 EOHR launched a campaign for confronting corruption and a fact finding committee to document the facts of the 25th of January Revolution.
 EOHR launched a campaign to cancel the emergency law and the emergency status. 
 EOHR launched a campaign to cancel imprisonment sentences for publishing charges. 
 EOHR listed the forcible detainees in Egypt starting 1990 and submitted the list to the Forcible Detention Committee of the United Nations.
 EOHR provides legal assistance to the needy woman at the headquarters or on phone since 1994. 
 EOHR spreads the human rights culture among the university students and the fresh graduate lawyers throughout training workshops. 
The EOHR also worked much on the political and constitutional reform issues:
 "Reform Priorities and Mechanisms in the Arab World" conference that aimed at the reactivation of the reform process in the Arab World. 
 EOHR 9th Intellectual Forum was held in February 2005 under the name of "the Constitutional Reform between Speeding up and Delay", and produced the Egyptian Constitutional Group", that includes members from the civil society NGO's, political parties, parliamentary members and constitutional law professors. The group aims at the amendment of the 1971 constitution to comply with the current Egyptian affairs. 
 EOHR 10th Intellectual Forum was held in October 2006 under the name of "Reform of the Egyptian Electoral System". The forum discussed the advantages and disadvantages of many electoral systems in different countries. 
 EOHR 11th Intellectual Forum was held in November 2011 under the name of "Towards a New Egyptian Constitution". The forum discussed the reasons that necessitate amending the 1971 constitution.

Publications 
Since 1985, EOHR has issued many kinds of publications on the human rights:
 Annual report on the human rights' situation in Egypt: the report provides general indicators on the human rights situation in Egypt in a complete year. EOHR has begun issuing this report on 1989. 
 "Defending Human Rights" report: EOHR has begun issuing "Defending Human Rights" report since 1990, documenting issues related to the human right' violations. It includes all the press releases and intellectual meetings'  reports in two years. 
 Human Rights'  Magazine: it is a magazine which covers different aspects of human rights.

References

Bibliography

 The Egyptian Organization for Human Rights: 'Information Booklet', Manyal el Roda Cairo, Egypt

External links
EOHR website
Egyptian Organisation for Human Rights

International Federation for Human Rights member organizations
Organizations established in 1985
Civil rights organizations
Human rights organisations based in Egypt
Organisations based in Cairo
1985 establishments in Egypt